Sequestrate may refer to:

pertaining either to secotioid or gasteroid
to sequester